Twelve Hearts for Charly is a 1949 German musical comedy film directed by  Fritz Andelfinger and Elly Rauch and starring Willy Fritsch, Heli Finkenzeller and Dorit Kreysler. The film was temporary banned in the American zone of occupation because of its perceived negative portrayal of American soldiers.

Synopsis
Two twin brothers are separated at birth and one is raised in America while the other grows up in Germany. After the Second World War, the American twin arrives as part of the occupation forces and leads a jazz band in his spare time. His brother, by contrast, teaches classical music at a girls school. After accidentally meeting, the two brothers decide to switch places, leading to many comic and romantic complications.

Cast
 Willy Fritsch as Dr. Wolfgang Amadeus Wagenbichler / Charly
 Heli Finkenzeller as Gabriele
 Käte Pontow as Annemarie
 Erika von Thellmann as Frau v. Auersbach
 Dorit Kreysler as Frau Eichhorn
 Penelope de Wall as Dorle, Kind
 Helga Mietzner as Maridl
 Wolf Harro as Toni, Sportlehrer
 Robert Demps as Georg Washington, Musiker
 Hans Hermann Pfeiffer as Dolmetscher

References

Bibliography
 Bock, Hans-Michael & Bergfelder, Tim. The Concise Cinegraph: Encyclopaedia of German Cinema. Berghahn Books, 2009.
 Fay, Jennifer. Theaters of Occupation: Hollywood and the Reeducation of Postwar Germany. University of Minnesota Press, 2008.

External links 
 

1949 films
1949 musical comedy films
German musical comedy films
1940s German-language films
Films about twin brothers
Films with screenplays by Karl Georg Külb
German black-and-white films
1940s German films